Sizihwan is a terminus of the Orange line and adjacent to Circular light rail Hamasen station of Kaohsiung Rapid Transit System. It is located in Hamasing of Gushan District, Kaohsiung. Its name is derived from Sizihwan, a nearby scenic area.

Station overview
The nearby TRA  closed after service began on the Orange Line through this station. It opened in 1908 to begin train service into the Kaohsiung Harbor area. The train station area will be turned into a railway cultural park.

Station design
The station is a two-level, underground station with an island platform. It is located at the junction of Linhai 2nd Road and Gushan 1st Road and has 2 exits.

Station layout

Exits
Exit 1: Gushan Ferry Station, Gushan Post Office 
Exit 2: Kaohsiung Customs, Kaohsiung Fisherman's Wharf

Around the station
 Bank of Taiwan, Gushan Branch
 Chunghwa Post, Gushan Post Office
 Former British Consulate at Takao
 Former Sanhe Bank
 Gushan Daitian Temple
 Gushan Elementary School
 Gushan Ferry Station
 Gushan Market
 Kaohsiung Fisherman's Wharf
 Kaohsiung Harbor Museum
 Kaohsiung Martyrs' Shrine
 Kaohsiung Wude Hall
 Mount Shou
 National Sun Yat-sen University
 North Gate of Xiong Town
 Port of Kaohsiung
 Shaochuantou Park
 Sizihwan Tunnel
 Takao Railway Museum (Formerly the Kaohsiung Port Station)

References

2008 establishments in Taiwan
Gushan District
Kaohsiung Metro Orange line stations
Railway stations opened in 2008